Quabbs is a small, scattered hamlet in the southwest of Shropshire, near the border between England and Wales. The name, which also occurs in Gloucestershire as a field name, is possibly derived from the Old English word cwabba, "marsh".

It is located in the rural civil parish of Bettws-y-Crwyn. The nearest village is Newcastle.

Quabbs lies at 390m above sea level.

See also
 Clun Valley
 Clun

References

External links

Hamlets in Shropshire